is a feminine Japanese given name.

Possible writings
Rumi can be written using different kanji characters and can mean:
留美, "detain, beauty"
瑠美, "lapis lazuli, beauty"
流美, "current/flow, beauty"
流水, "current/flow, water"
The name can also be written in hiragana or katakana.

Given name 
Rumi Hiiragi (瑠美, born 1987), Japanese actress
Rumi Ochiai (るみ, born 1973), Japanese voice actress
Rumi Kasahara (留美, born 1970), Japanese voice actress
Rumi Shishido (留美, born 1973), Japanese singer and voice actress
Rumi Ōkubo (瑠美, born 1989), Japanese voice actress
Rumi Suizu (瑠美, born 1990), Japanese figure skater
Rumi Tama (born 1949), Japanese film director, actress, and screenwriter
, Japanese women's footballer

Fictional characters
Rumi (ルミ), a character in the 1997 anime film Perfect Blue
Rumi Matsuura, a character in the manga and anime series Marmalade Boy
Rumi Nanase, a character in the Tactics's One: Kagayaku Kisetsu e video game
Rumi Komaki, a character in the Kamen Rider Fourze
Rumi Usagiyama, a character from the Shonen Jump manga and anime, My Hero Academia

See also 
Rumi (disambiguation)

Japanese feminine given names